Iosif Koloveros (born August 28, 2002) is a Greek professional basketball player for Lavrio of the Greek Basket League, on loan from Olympiacos. He is a 1.86 m (6'1 ") tall point guard.

Professional career
Koloveros began his pro career in 2019, during the 2018–19 season, with the Greek Basket League club Olympiacos. For the 2019–20 season, he was assigned to play in the Greek 2nd Division, with Olympiacos' reserve team, Olympiacos B.

Koloveros spent the 2021-2022 season on loan to Greek Basket League club Ionikos Nikaias. In 20 league games with Ionikos, he averaged 9.6 points, 2.5 rebounds, 2.4 assists and 1.4 steals, playing around 25 minutes per contest.

Koloveros started the 2022-2023 season with Olympiacos, but was loaned to Lavrio on December 8, 2022, in order to replace the injured Alexandros Nikolaidis.

National team career
Koloveros played with the junior national teams of Greece. With Greece's junior national teams, he played at the 2018 FIBA Under-16 European Championship, and the 2019 FIBA Under-19 World Cup.

References

External links
EuroLeague Under-18 Profile
Eurobasket.com Profile
Greek Basket League Profile 
RealGM.com Profile
DraftExpress.com Profile

2002 births
Living people
Greek men's basketball players
Ionikos Nikaias B.C. players
Lavrio B.C. players
Olympiacos B.C. B players
Olympiacos B.C. players
Point guards